Viacheslav Solodukhin (November 11, 1950 in Leningrad, Russia – December 1979) was a professional ice hockey player who played in the Soviet Hockey League.  He played for SKA St. Petersburg.  He also played for the Soviet team during the 1972 Summit Series against Canada.

Solodukhin committed suicide in 1979 in his car by carbon monoxide poisoning.

References

External links
 
 Summit Series bio

1950 births
1979 suicides
SKA Saint Petersburg players
Soviet ice hockey centres
Suicides by carbon monoxide poisoning
Suicides in the Soviet Union